A Cheshire acre is a unit of area historically used in the County of Cheshire.

One Cheshire acre amounts to 10,240 square yards, or 92,160 square feet whereas a standard acre amounts to 4,840 square yards or 43,560 square feet. Thus a Cheshire acre is about 2.12 times  or, expressed as a vulgar fraction  times, larger than a standard acre.

Whereas a one-acre area ten times as long as wide would have dimensions of 66 feet × 660 feet, the Cheshire acre of that shape would have dimensions of 96 feet × 960 feet.

References

Units of area